Laurence Monroe Klauber (December 21, 1883 in San Diego, California – May 8, 1968), was an American herpetologist and the foremost authority on rattlesnakes. He was the first curator of reptiles and amphibians at the San Diego Natural History Museum and Consulting Curator of Reptiles for the San Diego Zoo.  He was also a businessman, inventor, and contributed to mathematics in his study of the distribution of prime numbers.

Biography
The youngest of Theresa Epstein and  Abraham Klauber's twelve children, Klauber was born on December 21, 1883 in San Diego, California.  He received his A.B. degree (Electrical Engineering) from Stanford University in 1908 and completed a Westinghouse graduate apprenticeship course in 1910. He married Grace Gould in 1911, and in that same year began his career with San Diego Gas & Electric Company. He received an honorary LL.D. from the University of California, Los Angeles in 1941. Klauber died on May 8, 1968 in San Diego.

Businessman and inventor
Before becoming a herpetologist, Klauber worked for many years with the San Diego Gas & Electric Company. He worked his way up in the company from his first job as electric sign salesman thru electrical engineering positions; ultimately he became president in 1947, then Chairman of the Board of Directors, a position he held from 1950 until his retirement in 1953. Klauber held 9 U.S. patents (2 jointly) for inventions relating to energy transmission.

Herpetology
In 1923, Dr. Harry M. Wegeforth of the newly opened San Diego Zoo asked Klauber to identify several species of snake recently acquired. Even though reptiles were not much more than a hobby to him at the time, he took the job and eventually became Consulting Curator of Reptiles. In addition, he became a member of the Zoological Society's Board of Trustees in 1945, and served as its President from 1949 to 1951. As curator, he dedicated the following 35 years of his life to the study of reptiles, and rattlesnakes in particular. The end result of that considerable amount of time and amassed data was his magnum opus, the two-volume book entitled Rattlesnakes: Their Habits, Life Histories and Influence on Mankind, published in 1956. It is still considered to be the most complete and authoritative resource ever written on rattlesnakes.

In his research and field work, Klauber is credited with identifying 53 new taxa of reptiles and amphibians (such as Arizona elegans candida, Sonora palarostris, Pituophis catenifer pumilis, and Charina bottae umbratica) and has been recognized by his fellow herpetologists by having had 14 new taxa named after him (such as Chionactis occipitalis klauberi, Crotalus lepidus klauberi, Ensatina eschscholtzii klauberi, Hemidactylus klauberi, Hypsiglena torquata klauberi, Sauromalus klauberi, Sphaerodactylus klauberi, and Terrapene nelsoni klauberi ). He donated approximately 36,000 specimens to the San Diego Natural History Museum, and his extensive personal library and field notes were donated there upon his death.

Klauber's rattlesnake collection, containing over 8,600 specimens, comprises the core of the museum's Herpetology Department collection; at over 9,300 rattlesnake specimens, it is one of the largest rattlesnake collections in the world.

Mathematics

In the early 1930s, Klauber proposed a geometric arrangement of primes not unlike Ulam's spiral.  In 1932, Klauber presented a paper on a triangular, non-spiral matrix to the Mathematical Association of America demonstrating geometric regularity in the distribution of the primes. The lines of primes in the Klauber triangle meet at 60° angles, while in an Ulam Spiral, they meet at 90° angles.

Klauber's interest in mathematics—and the extensive samples of rattlesnakes that he accumulated for study—led to his most significant contribution to herpetology, the application of statistical methods to aid in the classification of reptiles. He pioneered the use of quantitative analysis in herpetology to determine variation in snakes and to weight the differences between species and subspecies.

Patents

Society memberships 

 American Association, Advancement of Science 
 American Chemical Society
 American Ecological Society 
 American Gas Association 
 American Geographical Society 
 American Mathematical Society
 American Museum of Natural History
 American Society Ichthyologists and Herpetologlsts (President, 1938–40) 
 American Society of Civil Engineers
 American Society of Mechanical Engineers
 American Statistical Association 
 California Academy of Sciences 
 Fellow, American Institute of Electrical Engineers 
 Mathematical Association of American 
 Pacific Coast Electrical Association (President 1911, J-24)  
 Pacific Coast Gas Association (President 1927-28) 
 San Diego Society of Natural History 
 Seismological Society of American 
 Western Society Naturalists 
 Sigma Xi 
 Tau Beta Pi

References

External links
Laurence M. Klauber biography, San Diego Natural History Museum
Klauber Herpetological Library
Eponymous species at Amphibian and Reptile Atlas of Peninsular California
Works by Laurence M. Klauber at JSTOR
Works by Laurence M. Klauber at Internet Archive
A Century of Progress in the Natural Sciences, 1853-1953. California Academy of Sciences, 1955.
 Finding aid to the Laurence Monroe Klauber Collection, Online Archive of California.
The San Diego Natural History Museum Research Library houses a significant collection of Laurence Klauber's papers, data notebooks, daily diaries, correspondence, ephemera, and photographs.
Species Described by and for Laurence M. Klauber

American herpetologists
American curators
1883 births
1968 deaths
People associated with the San Diego Natural History Museum
People from San Diego
20th-century American zoologists